Inkigayo (English title: The Music Trend, previously Popular Song) is a South Korean music program broadcast by SBS. It airs live every Sunday. The show features some of the latest and most popular artists who perform on stage. It is broadcast from the SBS Open Hall in Deungchon-dong, Gangseo-gu, Seoul.

History 
Inkigayo debuted as SBS Popular Song in 1991 as a chart show, but was canceled in fall 1993 because it was replaced by TV Gayo 20 (TV 가요20). It was later revived in 1998 with its original title and format. In 2003, the chart format was removed and was replaced by Take 7, where seven of the most popular artists from the week are featured and the most popular artist receives the award for Mutizen Song.

In spring 2007, the program changed from a recorded broadcast to a live broadcast in an effort to boost ratings, as well as changing the English name to The Music Trend. On November 2, 2008, the program moved from 3:20 pm to 4:10 pm Sunday afternoons, airing before Good Sunday, also to boost ratings. In spring 2010, the program expanded to 70 minutes beginning at 3:50 pm every Sunday.

On July 10, 2012, SBS announced revamping the show removing the Take 7 system and Mutizen Song award, explaining that "we believe that rather than the ranking system, the most important thing is the genre K-Pop being recognized worldwide. Therefore, we have decided to abolish the system after much discussion. There’s really no meaning behind a ranking system. We have decided to undergo this change in hopes that viewers can just enjoy the music. There are a lot of K-Pop stars in the music industry that have talent. We wanted to break free from the repetitive system, in which artists release new songs and perform, so we plan on redesigning our system by having the concept of more special stages. For viewers to enjoy the music, we will have more collaboration stages and much more." The revamped show, without Take 7 and Mutizen Song award, began on July 15, 2012.

On March 3, 2013, the program announced the revival of the chart system with Inkigayo Chart. The new chart is a collaboration with the Music Industry Association of Korea's Gaon Chart, and began March 17, 2013.

Hosts

Segments

Super Rookie 
Every week, a "rookie" artist or group performed live on stage. At the end of the month, a "Super Rookie" was chosen, through votes from the Inkigayo homepage, and was featured that month. This segment ended at the end of 2010.

2008
April – Peter (피터)
May – Deb (뎁)
June – NAVI
July – H7
August – TGUS
September – 2AM
October – Symmetry
November – IU
December – XING

2009
January – ZY
February – Achtung (악퉁)
March – Maydoni (메이다니)
April – JUMPER
May – AJ
June – Answer
July – SOOLj (술제이)
August – 4Minute
September – Supreme Team
October – B2Y
November – SHU-I
December – Beast

2010
January – Jung Suk (정석)
February – Shaun L (션엘)
March – MIJI (미지)
June – Kim Yeo-hee (김여희)
July – Ari (아리)
August – Teen Top
September – Go Eun (고은)
October – Bohemian (보헤미안)
November – Bebe Mignon (베베미뇽)
December – One Way

Digital Music Charts 
Formerly known as Mobile Ranking, the Digital Music Charts takes into consideration the popularity of songs through downloads on mobile phones as well as downloads on music sites. Every week, it features five ranks with a special guest(s) to host the segment. This segment was abandoned mid-2009.

Campaign Songs 
Throughout each episode, various artists are featured in campaign songs that raise awareness for certain topics or issues. Such campaigns include: safe driving, drinking milk, piracy, and various local events.

Take 7 
Take 7 is the representative segment of Inkigayo. Every week, seven of the most popular songs of that week are featured, where most artists will perform. At the end of the show, the Mutizen Song ("Mutizen" is a portmanteau of "music" and "netizen", symbolizing a song chosen by netizens) which is the most popular song of the week, receives the award. This has replaced the regular countdown charts format seen in most music programs and eliminates the need to rank artists. One song can only receive the award a maximum of three times. The following week, it is removed from the Take 7 list. This system was abolished on July 10, 2012.

First Place winners

1998 

February
1998.02.01 – Turbo – 회상 (December)
1998.02.08 – Turbo – 회상 (December)
1998.02.15 – Turbo – 회상 (December)
1998.02.22 – S.E.S. – I'm Your Girl

March
1998.03.01 – S.E.S. – I'm Your Girl
1998.03.08 – Park Jin-young – Honey
1998.03.15 – Park Jin-young – Honey
1998.03.22 – Shin Seung-hun – 지킬수 없는 약속 (A Promise I Can't Follow)
1998.03.29 – Shin Seung-hun – 지킬수 없는 약속 (A Promise I Can't Follow)

April
1998.04.05 – Shin Seung-hun – 지킬수 없는 약속 (A Promise I Can't Follow)
1998.04.12 – S.E.S. – Oh, My Love
1998.04.19 – Cool – 애상 (Sorrow)
1998.04.26 – Cool – 애상 (Sorrow)

May
1998.05.03 – Cool – 애상 (Sorrow)
1998.05.10 – Cool – 애상 (Sorrow)
1998.05.17 – Im Chang-jung – 별이 되어 (Be A Star)
1998.05.24 – Im Chang-jung – 별이 되어 (Be A Star)
1998.05.31 – No Show

June
1998.06.07 – Yoo Seung-jun – 나나나 (Na Na Na)
1998.06.14 – Yoo Seung-jun – 나나나 (Na Na Na)
1998.06.21 – Yoo Seung-jun – 나나나 (Na Na Na)
1998.06.28 – Yoo Seung-jun – 나나나 (Na Na Na)

July
1998.07.05 – Diva – 왜 불러 (Why Do U Call Me)
1998.07.12 – Kim Min-jong – 착한 사랑 (Sincere Love)
1998.07.19 – Kim Min-jong – 착한 사랑 (Sincere Love)
1998.07.26 – Kim Min-jong – 착한 사랑 (Sincere Love)

August
1998.08.02 – Kim Min-jong – 착한 사랑 (Sincere Love)
1998.08.09 – Kim Hyun-jung – 그녀와의 이별 (Breakup With Her)
1998.08.16 – Kim Hyun-jung – 그녀와의 이별 (Breakup With Her)
1998.08.23 – Sechs Kies – Road Fighter
1998.08.30 – Sechs Kies – Road Fighter

September
1998.09.06 – Fin.K.L – 내 남자친구에게 (To My Boyfriend)
1998.09.13 – Fin.K.L – 내 남자친구에게 (To My Boyfriend)
1998.09.20 – Uhm Jung-hwa – 포이즌 (Poison)
1998.09.27 – Sechs Kies – 무모한 사랑 (Reckless Love)

October
1998.10.04 – Uhm Jung-hwa – 포이즌 (Poison)
1998.10.11 – Sechs Kies – 무모한 사랑 (Reckless Love)
1998.10.18 – H.O.T. – 열맞춰 (Line Up)
1998.10.25 – No Show

November
1998.11.01 – No Show
1998.11.08 – H.O.T. – 열맞춰 (Line Up)
1998.11.15 – Fin.K.L – 루비 (Ruby)
1998.11.22 – Turbo – 애인이 생겼어요 (I Got a Girlfriend)
1998.11.29 – H.O.T. – 빛 (Hope)

December
1998.12.06 – H.O.T. – 빛 (Hope)
1998.12.13 – H.O.T. – 빛 (Hope)
1998.12.20 – Sechs Kies – 커플 (Couple)
1998.12.27 – No Show

1999 

January 
1999.01.03 – Sechs Kies – 커플 (Couple)
1999.01.10 – S.E.S. – Dreams Come True
1999.01.17 – Turbo – X
1999.01.24 – 1TYM – 1TYM
1999.01.31 – S.E.S. – 너를 사랑해 (I Love You)

February
1999.02.07 – 1TYM – 1TYM
1999.02.14 – 1TYM – 1TYM
1999.02.21 – No Show
1999.02.28 – S.E.S. – 너를 사랑해 (I Love You)

March
1999.03.07 – S.E.S. – 너를 사랑해 (I Love You)
1999.03.14 – Cool – Misery 
1999.03.21 – Roo'ra – 기도 (Good)
1999.03.28 – Roo'ra – 기도 (Good)

April
1999.04.04 – Roo'ra – 기도 (Good)
1999.04.11 – Kim Hyun-jung – 되돌아온 이별 (Separation Can Come Back)
1999.04.18 – Kim Hyun-jung – 되돌아온 이별 (Separation Can Come Back)
1999.04.25 – Kim Min-jong – 비원 (One's Earnest Prayer)

May
1999.05.02 – Im Chang-jung – Love Affair
1999.05.09 – Yoo Seung-jun – 열정 (Passion)
1999.05.16 – Yoo Seung-jun – 열정 (Passion)
1999.05.23 – No Show
1999.05.30 – Yoo Seung-jun – 열정 (Passion)

June
1999.06.06 – No Show
1999.06.13 – Fin.K.L – 영원한 사랑 (Forever Love)
1999.06.20 – Fin.K.L – 영원한 사랑 (Forever Love)
1999.06.27 – Fin.K.L – 영원한 사랑 (Forever Love)

July
1999.07.04 – Shinhwa – T.O.P
1999.07.11 – Yoo Seung-jun – 슬픈 침묵 (Sad Silence)
1999.07.18 – Shinhwa – T.O.P
1999.07.25 – Uhm Jung-hwa – 몰라 (I Don't Know)

August
1999.08.01 – Fin.K.L –자존심 (Pride)
1999.08.08 – Country Kko Kko – 일심 (One Heart)
1999.08.15 – Shinhwa – Yo!
1999.08.22 – Shinhwa – Yo!
1999.08.29 – Baby V.O.X. – Get Up

September
1999.09.05 – Park Ji-yoon – 가버려 (Go Away)
1999.09.12 – Sechs Kies – Com' Back
1999.09.19 – Sechs Kies – Com' Back
1999.09.26 – Sechs Kies – Com' Back

October
1999.10.03 – H.O.T. – 아이야 (I Yah)
1999.10.10 – H.O.T. – 아이야 (I Yah)
1999.10.17 – No Show
1999.10.24 – H.O.T. – 아이야 (I Yah)
1999.10.31 – Baby V.O.X. – Killer

November
1999.11.07 – Sechs Kies – 예감 (Premonition)
1999.11.14 – Jo Sung-mo – For Your Soul
1999.11.21 – Sechs Kies – 예감 (Premonition)
1999.11.28 – Lee Jung-hyun – 와 (Wa)

December
1999.12.05 – Lee Jung-hyun – 와 (Wa)
1999.12.12 – Fin.K.L – To My Prince
1999.12.19 – Yoo Seung-jun – 비전 (Vision)
1999.12.26 – Yoo Seung-jun – 비전 (Vision)

2000 

January 
2000.01.02 – Yoo Seung-jun – 비전 (Vision)
2000.01.09 – g.o.d – 사랑해 그리고 기억해 (Love and Memory)
2000.01.16 – Lee Jung-hyun – 바꿔 (Change)
2000.01.23 – S.E.S. – Twilight Zone
2000.01.30 – SKY – 영원 (Forever)

February
2000.02.06 – No Show
2000.02.13 – Yoo Seung-jun – 연가 (Love Song)
2000.02.20 – Yoo Seung-jun – 연가 (Love Song)
2000.02.27 – Jo Sung-mo – 가시나무 (Thorn Tree)

March
2000.03.05 – g.o.d – 애수 (Sorrow)
2000.03.12 – g.o.d – 애수 (Sorrow)
2000.03.19 – g.o.d – 애수 (Sorrow)
2000.03.26 – Im Chang-jung – 나의 연인 (My Lover)

April
2000.04.02 – Im Chang-jung – 나의 연인 (My Lover)
2000.04.09 – g.o.d  – Friday Night
2000.04.16 – g.o.d  – Friday Night
2000.04.23 – g.o.d  – Friday Night
2000.04.30 – Chakra – 한 (Hate)

May
2000.05.07 – Kim Min-jong – 왜 (Why)
2000.05.14 – Kim Min-jong – 왜 (Why)
2000.05.21 – Kim Min-jong – 왜 (Why)
2000.05.28 – No Show

June
2000.06.04 – 1TYM – One Love
2000.06.11 – Baek Ji-young – Dash
2000.06.18 – Baek Ji-young – Dash
2000.06.25 – J – 어제처럼 (Like Yesterday)

July
2000.07.02 – Kim Hyun-jung – 멍 (Bruise)
2000.07.09 – Shinhwa – Only One
2000.07.16 – Shinhwa – Only One
2000.07.23 – Country Kko Kko – 오! 가니 (Oh! Do You Leave Me?)
2000.07.30 – Country Kko Kko – 오! 가니 (Oh! Do You Leave Me?)

August
2000.08.06 – Lee Jung-hyun – 너 (You)
2000.08.13 – Lee Jung-hyun – 너 (You)
2000.08.20 – Baek Ji-young – Sad Salsa
2000.08.27 – Shinhwa – All Your Dreams

September
2000.09.03 – Hong Kyung-min – 흔들린 우정 (Broken Friendship)
2000.09.10 – Hong Kyung-min – 흔들린 우정 (Broken Friendship)
2000.09.17 – No Show
2000.09.24 – Jo Sung-mo – 아시나요 (Do You Know)

October
2000.10.01 – No Show
2000.10.08 – Jo Sung-mo – 아시나요 (Do You Know)
2000.10.15 – Jo Sung-mo – 아시나요 (Do You Know)
2000.10.22 – H.O.T. – Outside Castle
2000.10.29 – H.O.T. – Outside Castle

November
2000.11.05 – H.O.T. – Outside Castle
2000.11.12 – Fin.K.L – Now
2000.11.19 – Fin.K.L – Now
2000.11.26 – Fin.K.L – Now

December
2000.12.03 – g.o.d – 거짓말 (Lies)
2000.12.10 – g.o.d. – 거짓말 (Lies)
2000.12.17 – g.o.d. – 거짓말 (Lies)
2000.12.24 – Yoo Seung-jun – 찾길 바래 (I'll Be Back)
2000.12.31 – No Show

2001 

January 
2001.01.07 – Yoo Seung-jun – 찾길 바래 (I'll Be Back)
2001.01.14 – Yoo Seung-jun – 찾길 바래 (I'll Be Back)
2001.01.21 – Im Chang-jung – 날 닮은 너 (You're Like Me)
2001.01.28 – Im Chang-jung – 날 닮은 너 (You're Like Me)

February
2001.02.04 – g.o.d – 니가 필요해 (I Need You)
2001.02.11 – g.o.d – 니가 필요해 (I Need You)
2001.02.18 – S.E.S. – 감싸 안으며 (Show Me Your Love)
2001.02.25 – S.E.S. – 감싸 안으며 (Show Me Your Love)

March
2001.03.04 – Position – I Love You
2001.03.11 – Position – I Love You
2001.03.18 – Position – I Love You
2001.03.25 – Lee Ji-hoon – 인형 (Doll)

April
2001.04.01 – Cha Tae-hyun – I Love You
2001.04.08 – Jinusean – A-Yo
2001.04.15 – S♯arp – Sweety
2001.04.22 – S♯arp –  Sweety
2001.04.29 – Chakra – 끝 (End)

May
2001.05.06 – Psy – 새 (Bird)
2001.05.13 – Fin.K.L – 당신은 모르실거야 (You'll Never Know)
2001.05.20 – No Show
2001.05.27 – Fin.K.L – 당신은 모르실거야 (You'll Never Know)

June
2001.06.03 – Drunken Tiger – Good Life
2001.06.10 – Drunken Tiger – Good Life
2001.06.17 – Click-B – 백전무패 (Undefeatable)
2001.06.24 – Psy – 끝 (End)

July
2001.07.01 – S♯arp – 백일기도 (100 Days Prayer)
2001.07.08 – Kim Gun-mo – 짱가
2001.07.15 – Kim Gun-mo – 짱가
2001.07.22 – Kim Gun-mo – 짱가
2001.07.29 – MC the Max – 사랑하니까 (Because Of Love)

August
2001.08.05 – Park Jin-young –  난 여자가 있는데 (I Have A Woman)
2001.08.12 – Cool – Jumpo Mambo
2001.08.19 – Cool – Jumpo Mambo
2001.08.26 – UN – 파도 (Ocean Wave)

September
2001.09.02 – S.E.S. – 꿈을 모아서 (Just In Love)
2001.09.09 – Shinhwa – Hey, Come On
2001.09.16 – Shinhwa – Hey, Come On
2001.09.23 – Im Chang-jung – 기다리는 이유 (Reason to Wait)
2001.09.30 – Im Chang-jung – 기다리는 이유 (Reason to Wait)

October
2001.10.07 – Yoo Seung-jun – Wow
2001.10.14 – Yoo Seung-jun – Wow
2001.10.21 – Yoo Seung-jun – Wow
2001.10.28 – Wax – 화장을 고치고 (Redoing My Makeup)

November
2001.11.04 – Lee Ki-chan – 또 한번 사랑은 가고 (Love Has Left Again)
2001.11.11 – Lee Ki-chan – 또 한번 사랑은 가고 (Love Has Left Again)
2001.11.18 – UN – 선물 (Gift)
2001.11.25 – Kim Min-jong – You're My Life

December
2001.12.02 – Jang Na-ra – 고백 (Confession)
2001.12.09 – g.o.d – 길 (Road)
2001.12.16 – g.o.d – 길 (Road)
2001.12.23 – g.o.d – 길 (Road)
2001.12.30 – No Show

2002 

January
2002.01.06 – T (Yoon Mi-rae) – 시간이 흐른 뒤 (As Time Goes By)
2002.01.13 – S#arp – 내입술... 따뜻한 커피처럼 (My Lips... Warm Like Coffee)
2002.01.20 – Jang Na-ra – 4월 이야기 (April Story)
2002.01.27 – g.o.d – 니가 있어야 할 곳 (Place Where You Need To Be)

February
2002.02.03 – g.o.d – 니가 있어야 할 곳 (Place Where You Need To Be)
2002.02.10 – g.o.d – 니가 있어야 할 곳 (Place Where You Need To Be)
2002.02.17 – jtL – A Better Day
2002.02.24 – jtL – A Better Day

March 
2002.03.03 – jtL – A Better Day
2002.03.10 – S.E.S. – U
2002.03.17 – S.E.S. – U
2002.03.24 – S.E.S. – U
2002.03.31 – Fin.K.L – 영원 (Forever)

April
2002.04.07 – Fin.K.L – 영원 (Forever)
2002.04.14 – Fin.K.L – 영원 (Forever)
2002.04.21 – Shinhwa – Perfect Man
2002.04.28 – Shinhwa – Perfect Man

May
2002.05.05 – Shinhwa – Perfect Man
2002.05.12 – BoA – No. 1
2002.05.19 – BoA – No. 1
2002.05.26 – BoA – No. 1

June
2002.06.02 – Country Kko Kko – Conga
2002.06.09 – Baby V.O.X. – 우연 (By Chance)
2002.06.16 – Baby V.O.X. – 우연 (By Chance)
2002.06.23 – Im Chang-jung – 슬픈 혼잣말 (Sad Monologue)
2002.06.30 – Im Chang-jung – 슬픈 혼잣말 (Sad Monologue)

July
2002.07.07 – Im Chang-jung – 슬픈 혼잣말 (Sad Monologue)
2002.07.14 – Fly to the Sky – Sea Of Love
2002.07.21 – Fly to the Sky – Sea Of Love
2002.07.28 – Wheesung – 안되나요 (Can't You, Please)

August
2002.08.04 – Wheesung – 안되나요 (Can't You, Please)
2002.08.11 – Cool – 진실 (Truth)
2002.08.18 – Cool – 진실 (Truth)
2002.08.25 – Sung Si-kyung – 우린 제법 잘 어울려요 (We're A Well-Assorted Couple)

September
2002.09.01 – Moon Hee-joon – 아낌없이 주는 나무 (Generous...)
2002.09.08 – Wax – 부탁해요 (A Request From You)
2002.09.15 – Wax – 부탁해요 (A Request From You)
2002.09.22 – No Show
2002.09.29 – Kim Hyun-jung – 단칼 (Show Revolution)

October
2002.10.06 – Rain – 안녕이란 말 대신 (Instead of Saying Goodbye)
2002.10.13 – Kangta – 사랑은 기억보다 (Memories)
2002.10.20 – Lee Soo-young – 라라라 (La La La)
2002.10.27 – No Show

November
2002.11.03 – Jang Na-ra – Sweet Dream
2002.11.10 – BoA – Valenti
2002.11.17 – Park Hyo-shin – 좋은 사람 (Good Person)
2002.11.24 – Park Hyo-shin – 좋은 사람 (Good Person)

December
2002.12.01 – Psy – 챔피언 (Champion)
2002.12.08 – YG Family – 멋쟁이 신사 (Turn It Up)
2002.12.15 – UN – Miracle
2002.12.22 – UN – Miracle
2002.12.29 – No Show

2003 

January
2003.01.05 – Lee Ki-chan – 감기 (A Cold)
2003.01.12 – Boohwal – Never Ending Story
2003.01.19 – Boohwal – Never Ending Story
2003.01.26 – Jang Na-ra – Snow Man

Mutizen Song winners

2003 

February
2003.02.02 – No Show
2003.02.09 – Shinhwa – 너의 결혼식 (Your Wedding)
2003.02.16 – Shinhwa – 너의 결혼식 (Your Wedding)
2003.02.23 – No Show

March
2003.03.02 – g.o.d – 0%
2003.03.09 – Lee Soo-young – Good-bye
2003.03.16 – Click-B – Cowboy
2003.03.23 – NRG – Hit song
2003.03.30 – Park Ji-yoon – DJ

April
2003.04.06 – Kim Gun-mo – My son
2003.04.13 – NRG – Hit song
2003.04.20 – Jo Sung-mo – 피아노 (Piano)
2003.04.27 – Ahn Jae-wook – 친구 (Friend)

May
2003.05.04 – SE7EN – 와줘 (Come Back to Me)
2003.05.11 – SE7EN – 와줘 (Come Back to Me)
2003.05.18 – No Show
2003.05.25 – No Show

June
2003.06.01 – Baby V.O.X. – 나 어떡해 (What Should I Do)
2003.06.08 – Cha Tae-hyun – Again to me
2003.06.15 – Cha Tae-hyun – Again to me
2003.06.22 – BoA – 아틀란티스 소녀 (Atlantis Princess)
2003.06.29 – Koyote – 비상 (Emergency)

July
2003.07.06 – BoA – 아틀란티스 소녀 (Atlantis Princess)
2003.07.13 – BoA – 아틀란티스 소녀 (Atlantis Princess)
2003.07.20 – Im Chang-jung – 소주한잔 (A Glass of Soju)
2003.07.27 – No Show

August
2003.08.03 – Cool – 결혼을 할거라면 (If You Will Get Married)
2003.08.10 – Cool – 결혼을 할거라면 (If You Will Get Married)
2003.08.17 – Cool – 결혼을 할거라면 (If You Will Get Married)
2003.08.24 – Fly to the Sky – Missing you
2003.08.31 – Fly to the Sky – Missing you

September
2003.09.07 – Lee Hyori – 10 Minutes
2003.09.14 – Lee Hyori – 10 Minutes
2003.09.21 – Lee Hyori – 10 Minutes
2003.09.28 – jtL – Without your love

October
2003.10.05 – Wheesung – With me
2003.10.12 – Wheesung – With me
2003.10.19 – S – I Swear
2003.10.26 – S – I Swear

November
2003.11.02 – S – I Swear
2003.11.09 – Rain – 태양을 피하는 방법 (Ways to Avoid the Sun)
2003.11.16 – No Show
2003.11.23 – Rain – 태양을 피하는 방법 (Ways to Avoid the Sun)
2003.11.30 – Rain – 태양을 피하는 방법 (Ways to Avoid the Sun)

December
2003.12.07 – Wheesung – 다시 만난 날 (The Day We Meet Again)
2003.12.14 – Lexy – 애송이 (Greenhorn)
2003.12.21 – Lexy – 애송이 (Greenhorn)
2003.12.28 – Sung Si-kyung – 차마 (Endure)

2004 

January
2004.01.04 – Jang Na-ra – 기도 (Pray)
2004.01.11 – Jang Na-ra – 기도 (Pray)
2004.01.18 – M.C. the MAX – 사랑의시 (Love's Poem)
2004.01.25 – M.C. the MAX – 사랑의시 (Love's Poem)

February
2004.02.01 – 1TYM – HOT 뜨거 (HOT)
2004.02.08 – 1TYM – HOT 뜨거 (HOT)
2004.02.15 – M.C. the MAX – 사랑의시 (Love's Poem)
2004.02.22 – 1TYM – HOT 뜨거 (HOT)
2004.02.29 – Tei – 사랑은 향기를 남기고 (Love Leaves A Scent)

March
2004.03.07 – Tei – 사랑은 향기를 남기고 (Love Leaves A Scent)
2004.03.14 – Tei – 사랑은 향기를 남기고 (Love Leaves A Scent)
2004.03.21 – M.C. the MAX – 그대는 눈물겹다 (When the Tears Lay)
2004.03.28 – TVXQ – Hug

April
2004.04.04 – TVXQ – Hug
2004.04.11 – TVXQ – Hug
2004.04.18 – Koyote – 디스코왕 (Disco King)
2004.04.25 – No Show

May
2004.05.02 – Koyote – 디스코왕 (Disco King)
2004.05.09 – Cho PD – 친구여 (My Friend)
2004.05.16 – Koyote – 디스코왕 (Disco King)
2004.05.23 – Cho PD – 친구여 (My Friend)
2004.05.30 – MC Mong – 180도 (180 Degrees)

June
2004.06.06 – No Show
2004.06.13 – No Show
2004.06.20 – MC Mong – 180도 (180 Degrees)
2004.06.27 – Koyote – 불꽃 (Fireworks)

July
2004.07.04 – BoA – My Name
2004.07.11 – BoA – My Name
2004.07.18 – BoA – My Name
2004.07.25 – Tim – 고마웠다고... (I Said Thanks...)

August
2004.08.01 – Lyn – 사랑했잖아 (Used To Love)
2004.08.08 – SE7EN – 열정 (Passion)
2004.08.15 – SE7EN – 열정 (Passion)
2004.08.22 – Lee Seung-gi – 내여자라니까 (Because You're My Girl)
2004.08.29 – SE7EN – 열정 (Passion)

September
2004.09.05 – TVXQ – The Way U Are
2004.09.12 – BoA – Spark
2004.09.19 – BoA – Spark
2004.09.26 – Kim Jong-kook – 한남자 (One Man)

October
2004.10.03 – Kim Jong-kook – 한남자 (One Man)
2004.10.10 – Shinhwa – Brand New
2004.10.17 – Shinhwa – Brand New
2004.10.24 – No Show
2004.10.31 – Gummy – 기억상실 (Loss of Memory)

November
2004.11.07 – Rain – It's Raining
2004.11.14 – No Show
2004.11.21 – Rain – It's Raining
2004.11.28 – Rain – It's Raining

December
2004.12.05 – TVXQ – 믿어요 (I Believe)
2004.12.12 – Shinhwa – 열병 (Crazy)
2004.12.19 – Shinhwa – 열병 (Crazy)
2004.12.26 – Rain – I Do

2005 

January
2005.01.02 – TVXQ – Tri-Angle
2005.01.09 – g.o.d – 보통날 (An Ordinary Day)
2005.01.16 – g.o.d – 보통날 (An Ordinary Day)
2005.01.23 – M.C. the MAX – 행복하지 말아요 (Don't Say You're Happy)
2005.01.30 – g.o.d – 반대가 끌리는 이유 (The Reason Why Opposites Attract)

February
2005.02.06 – g.o.d – 반대가 끌리는 이유 (The Reason Why Opposites Attract)
2005.02.13 – g.o.d – 반대가 끌리는 이유 (The Reason Why Opposites Attract)
2005.02.20 – Tei – 사랑은 하나다 (Love Is... only one)
2005.02.27 – Tei – 사랑은 하나다 (Love Is... only one)

March
2005.03.06 – Tei – 사랑은 하나다 (Love Is... only one)
2005.03.13 – M.C. the MAX – 이별이라는 이름 (A Name Called Leave)
2005.03.20 – Jo Sung-mo – Mr.Flower
2005.03.27 – Buzz – 겁쟁이 (Coward)

April
2005.04.03 – Jo Sung-mo – Mr.Flower
2005.04.10 – Jo Sung-mo – Mr.Flower
2005.04.17 – Buzz – 겁쟁이 (Coward)
2005.04.24 – Buzz – 겁쟁이 (Coward)

May
2005.05.01 – Jewelry – Superstar
2005.05.08 – Jewelry – Superstar
2005.05.15 – SG Wannabe – 죄와벌 (Sin & Punishment)
2005.05.22 – SG Wannabe – 죄와벌 (Sin & Punishment)
2005.05.29 – Sung Si-kyung – 잘지내나요 (Take Care)

June
2005.06.05 – Shin Hye-sung – 같은생각 (Same Thought)
2005.06.12 – Shin Hye-sung – 같은생각 (Same Thought)
2005.06.19 – MC Mong – 천하무적 (Invincible)
2005.06.26 – Yoon Do-hyun – 사랑했나봐 (I Think I Loved You)

July
2005.07.03 – MC Mong –천하무적 (Invincible)
2005.07.10 – No Show
2005.07.17 – BoA – Girls On Top
2005.07.24 – BoA – Girls On Top
2005.07.31 – BoA – Girls On Top

August
2005.08.07 – Kim Jong-kook – 제자리걸음 (Walking in the Same Place)
2005.08.14 – Kim Jong-kook – 제자리걸음 (Walking in the Same Place)
2005.08.21 – Kim Jong-kook – 제자리걸음 (Walking in the Same Place)
2005.08.28 – MC Mong – I Love U Oh Thank U

September
2005.09.04 – MC Mong – I Love U Oh Thank U
2005.09.11 – Kim Jong-kook – 사랑스러워 (Lovely)
2005.09.18 – No Show
2005.09.25 – Kim Jong-kook – 사랑스러워 (Lovely)

October
2005.10.02 – Kim Jong-kook – 사랑스러워 (Lovely)
2005.10.09 – TVXQ – Rising Sun
2005.10.16 – TVXQ – Rising Sun
2005.10.23 – TVXQ – Rising Sun
2005.10.30 – Wheesung – Good bye luv

November
2005.11.06 – Wheesung – Good bye luv
2005.11.13 – No Show
2005.11.20 – Lee Min-woo – Girl Friend
2005.11.27 – Epik High – Fly

December
2005.12.04 – g.o.d – 2♡
2005.12.11 – Wheesung – 일년이면 (A Year Gone)
2005.12.18 – LeeSsang – 내가 웃는게 아니야 (I'm Not Really Laughing)
2005.12.25 – LeeSsang – 내가 웃는게 아니야 (I'm Not Really Laughing)

2006 

January
2006.01.01 – No Show
2006.01.08 – Tei – 그리움을 외치다 (Screaming I miss you)
2006.01.15 – M.C. the MAX – 사랑은 아프려고 하는거죠 (Love is Supposed to Hurt)
2006.01.22 – M.C. the MAX – 사랑은 아프려고 하는거죠 (Love is Supposed to Hurt)
2006.01.29 – No Show

February
2006.02.05 – Fly to the Sky – 남자답게 (Like a Man)
2006.02.12 – Fly to the Sky – 남자답게 (Like a Man)
2006.02.19 – Fly to the Sky – 남자답게 (Like a Man)
2006.02.26 – Lee Soo-young – Grace

March
2006.03.05 – Lee Soo-young – Grace
2006.03.12 – Lee Hyori – Get Ya
2006.03.19 – Lee Hyori – Get Ya
2006.03.26 – No Show

April
2006.04.02 – Lee Seung-gi – 하기 힘든말 (Words are Hard to Say)
2006.04.09 – Fly to the Sky – 피(避) (Evasion)
2006.04.16 – SE7EN – 난 알아요 (I Know)
2006.04.23 – SeeYa – 여인의 향기 (A Woman's Scent)
2006.04.30 – SG Wannabe – 내사람 (Partner for Life)

May
2006.05.07 – SG Wannabe – 내사람 (Partner for Life)
2006.05.14 – SG Wannabe – 내사람 (Partner for Life)
2006.05.21 – Tony An – 유추프라카치아 (Yutzpracachia)
2006.05.28 – No Show

June
2006.06.04 – Baek Ji-young – 사랑안해 (Don't Love)
2006.06.11 – Shinhwa – Once in a Life Time
2006.06.18 – Shinhwa – Once in a Life Time
2006.06.25 – Super Junior – U

July
2006.07.02 – Buzz – 남자를 몰라 (Confusion About Men)
2006.07.09 – Super Junior – U
2006.07.16 – Super Junior – U
2006.07.23 – SG Wannabe – 사랑했어요 (I Loved You)
2006.07.30 – SG Wannabe – 사랑했어요 (I Loved You)

August
2006.08.06 – SG Wannabe – 사랑했어요 (I Loved You)
2006.08.13 – Psy– 연예인 (Entertainer)
2006.08.20 – Super Junior – Dancing Out
2006.08.27 – Turtles – 비행기 (Airplane)

September
2006.09.03 – Turtles – 비행기 (Airplane)
2006.09.10 – Psy – 연예인 (Entertainer)
2006.09.17 – Psy – 연예인 (Entertainer)
2006.09.24 – Zhang Liyin (feat. Xiah Junsu) – Timeless

October
2006.10.01 – Lee Seung-gi – 제발 (Please)
2006.10.08 – No Show
2006.10.15 – TVXQ – "O"–正.反.合. ("O" – Jung.Ban.Hap.)
2006.10.22 – No Show
2006.10.29 – TVXQ – "O"–正.反.合. ("O" – Jung.Ban.Hap.)

November
2006.11.05 – TVXQ – "O"–正.反.合. ("O" – Jung.Ban.Hap.)
2006.11.12 – No Show
2006.11.19 – MC Mong – 아이스크림 (Ice Cream)
2006.11.26 – Eru – 까만안경 (Black Glasses)

December
2006.12.03 – Sung Si-kyung – 거리에서 (On The Street)
2006.12.10 – SE7EN – 라라라 (La La La)
2006.12.17 – Jun Jin – 사랑이 오지 않아요 (Love Doesn't Come)
2006.12.24 – Jang Woo-hyuk – 폭풍속으로 (One Way)
2006.12.31 – No Show

2007

2008

2009

2010

2011

2012

Inkigayo Q 
Viewers can ask a designated artist of the week questions through SBS mobile app Soty. During this interview segment, selected questions are asked and those users receive prizes for their participation. This segment began on February 17, 2013.

Inkigayo Showcase 
A new stage to showcase talented indie and new artists who are hard to see on television each week. This segment began along with Inkigayo Chart on March 17, 2013.

Inkigayo Chart 
After abolishing Take 7 in July 2012, a new chart system was implemented on March 17, 2013. The revived chart features fifty songs for viewers to vote on (like the previous Take 7 chart) through SBS mobile app Soty, combined with Digital Song Chart and Offline Album Chart in collaboration with the Music Industry Association of Korea's Gaon Chart to create the Inkigayo Chart.

The chart is tracked from Monday to Monday of the following week.

Every songs that not wins 3 times yet (i.e.: Triple crown) is eligible from this chart, regardless of when songs release. However, OST, songs released through audition program and deemed unsuitable (at SBS's discretion) is not eligible.

Based source and explanations for each criteria

 Broadcast: Number of times that a songs played on SBS
 Digital sales: Number of streaming and download based on Korean chart. Currently is Melon, Genie, FLO. Former based source included Bugs.
 Live-vote: Voting during the show. Currently via Starpass, previously via text message. Always for 1st place nominees only.
 Physical album: Number of copies based on Gaon album chart
 Video views or SNS: YouTube views, counted from official MV only.
 Pre-voting: Voting and netizen choices happens before show start. Currently via Melon. Previously via Inkigayo website. This is held from Monday to Saturday

First Place winners

2013

2014

2015 – present

Achievements by artists 

Most No. 1/Mutizen Song winners

Most Triple Crown winners

Top 10 Highest Scores March 24, 2013 – February 1, 2015

Top 10 Highest Scores February 8, 2015 – January 29, 2017

Top 10 Highest Scores February 5, 2017 – May 28, 2017

Top 10 Highest Scores June 4, 2017 – January 27, 2019

Top 10 Highest Scores February 3, 2019 – January 17, 2021

Top 10 Highest Scores January 24, 2021 – present

Top 10 Highest Scores March 24, 2013 – present

Triple Crown

Triple Crown (Old system) 
Triple Crown is a song that has received Mutizen Song three times. After that, the song was removed from Take 7 and was ineligible to win again.

Triple Crown (New system)
Triple Crown is a song that has received First Place three times. After that, the song is removed from the chart and ineligible to win again.

Similar programs 
KBS Music Bank
MBC Show! Music Core
Mnet M Countdown
Arirang TV Pops in Seoul
Arirang TV Simply K-Pop (formerly called The M-Wave and Wave K) 
JTBC Music on Top
JTBC Music Universe K-909
MBC M Show Champion
SBS M The Show

See also 
 SBS Gayo Daejeon
 Music programs of South Korea

Notes

References

External links 

 Inkigayo Official website 
  .

Seoul Broadcasting System original programming
1991 South Korean television series debuts
1993 South Korean television series endings
1998 South Korean television series debuts
1990s South Korean television series
2000s South Korean television series
2010s South Korean television series
South Korean music chart television shows
Korean-language television shows
South Korean music television shows